Joyce Evyonne Cohen (born March 27, 1937) was an American politician who was a member of the Oregon House of Representatives and Oregon State Senate.

References

1937 births
Living people
Democratic Party members of the Oregon House of Representatives
Politicians from Portland, Oregon
People from Corson County, South Dakota